State Criminal Investigation and Intelligence Department (SCIID) is a Nigerian government domestic criminal and intelligence unit of the Nigerian Police Force responsible for investigating crimes and intelligence reports. It is the primary investigating sector of the Nigeria Police Force.

The SCIID is led by Deputy Commissioner of Police Bolaji Salami.

Overview 
The SCIID carries out inquiries into diverse range of criminal offences in Nigeria. The police unit is authorized and empowered to carryout investigations, make arrest and prosecute criminals to the full extent of the Law of Nigeria. The unit serves to investigate and prosecute complex crimes in the country. On 9 July 2019, the unit launched its first tech-based interrogation facility. The facility was setup by The Rule of Law and Anti-Corruption (RoLAC), a programme by the European Union.

Structure 
They are a total of 8 active sections in the SCIID;

 Administration
 Anti-Fraud Section
 The Central Criminal Registry (CCR)
 Special Anti-Robbery Squad (SARS)
 Special Inquiry Bureau
 Special Fraud Unit (SFU)
 Anti- Kidnapping/ Anti-Cultist
 SIB

References

External links 

 SCIID official website

Crime in Nigeria